Ezra Meech (July 26, 1773September 23, 1856) was an American fur trader and politician. He served as a U.S. Representative from Vermont.

Biography
Meech was born in New London in the Connecticut Colony to Elisha Meech and Faith Satterly Meech. He moved to Hinesburg in the Vermont Republic with his parents in 1785 and attended the common schools. Meech engaged in the fur trade in the Northwest and in ship-timber contracts in British Canada. In 1795 he opened a store at Charlotte Four Corners, Vermont. He moved to Shelburne, Vermont and owned a farm. He also raised cattle and horses, and manufactured potash. In 1806 he was an agent of the Northwestern Fur Company.

Meech was a member of the Vermont House of Representatives from 1805 until 1807. He was elected as a Democratic-Republican candidate to the Sixteenth United States Congress, serving from March 4, 1819 until March 3, 1821. He was a delegate to the state constitutional conventions in 1822 and 1826, and was chief judge of the Chittenden County Court in 1822 and 1823.

Meech was elected as a Jacksonian candidate to the Nineteenth United States Congress, serving from March 4, 1825 until March 3, 1827. He was an unsuccessful Democratic candidate for Governor of Vermont in 1830, 1831, 1832, and 1833. Meech served as a presidential elector on the Whig ticket in 1840. He then resumed agricultural pursuits.

Personal life
Meech married Mary McNeil Meech in 1800. They had eight children.

Death
Meech died on September 23, 1856 in Shelburne, Vermont. He is interred at the Shelburne Village Cemetery.

References

Further reading
 "Genealogical and Family History of the State of Vermont: A Record of the Achievements of Her People in the Making of a Commonwealth and the Founding of a Nation, Volume 2" by Hiram Carleton, published by Lewis Publishing Company, 1903.

External links
 
 Biographical Director of the United States Congress
 Govtrack.us
 The Political Graveyard
 
 Ancestry.com
 19th Century Biographies
 Chittenden County Biographies: Biography of Hon. Ezra Beech

1773 births
1856 deaths
Politicians from New London, Connecticut
Vermont Jacksonians
Vermont Democrats
Vermont Whigs
Burials in Vermont
Democratic-Republican Party members of the United States House of Representatives from Vermont
Jacksonian members of the United States House of Representatives
19th-century American politicians